Sadereh (also Romanized as Şādereh; also known as Sādara) is a village in Mohr Rural District, in the Central District of Mohr County, Fars Province, Iran. At the 2006 census, its population was 473, in 103 families.

References 

Populated places in Mohr County